Marek Bartoš (born 13 October 1996) is a Slovak professional footballer who currently plays for Železiarne Podbrezová in 2. Liga as a defender.

Club career

Železiarne Podbrezová
Bartoš made his Fortuna Liga debut for Železiarne Podbrezová against DAC Dunajská Streda on 22 July 2018, during a home 1:2 defeat. He played the entirety of the game.

References

External links
 FK Železiarne Podbrezová official club profile 
 
 Futbalnet profile 
 

1996 births
Living people
Slovak footballers
Association football defenders
MŠK Púchov players
OFK Dunajská Lužná players
FK Pohronie players
FK Železiarne Podbrezová players
Slovak Super Liga players
2. Liga (Slovakia) players
3. Liga (Slovakia) players
Sportspeople from Spišská Nová Ves